The population of Rajasthan in 2011 Census of India was 68,548,437 Of this 9,238,534 persons belong to one of the Scheduled Tribes (STs) constituting 13.48 per cent of the total population of the state. The state has registered 30.2 per cent decadal growth in the Scheduled Tribe population between 2001-2011.

Main tribes 
*Bhil are the oldest people of Rajasthan.

The Mina is the largest tribe of the state in terms of population.

List of communities 
There are twelve (12) notified Scheduled Tribes in the state, which are as follows:

 Bhil, Bhil Garasia, Dholi Bhil, Dungri Bhil, Dungri Garasia, Mewasi Bhil, Rawal Bhil, Tadvi Bhil, Bhagalia, Bhilala, Pawra, Vasava, Vasave
 Bhil Mina
 Damor, Damaria
 Dhanka, Tadvi, Tetaria, Valvi
 Garasia (excluding Rajput Garasia)
 Kathodi, Katkari, Dhor Kathodi, Dhor Katkari, Son Kathodi, Son Katkari
 Kokna, Kokni, Kukna
 Koli Dhor, Tokre Koli, Kolcha, Kolgha
 Mina
 Naikda, Nayak, Cholivala Nayaka, Kapadia Nayaka, Mota Nayaka, Nana Nayaka
 Patelia
 Seharia, Sehria, Sahariya

Population in 2001

Population in 2011

Population in 2021

Scheduled areas 
In Rajasthan 5697 villages come under Scheduled Area.

References 

Scheduled Tribes of India
Social groups of Rajasthan